Stefano Arcieri (born 8 May 1998) is an Italian handball player who currently play for Italian club SSV Brixen Handball and the Italian national team.

References

1998 births
Living people
People from Teramo
Italian male handball players
Expatriate sportspeople in Finland
Sportspeople from the Province of Teramo
Mediterranean Games competitors for Italy
Competitors at the 2022 Mediterranean Games